Cutlass Bay Airport  is a public use airport serving Cutlass Bay, on the Cat Island in The Bahamas.

See also
List of airports in the Bahamas

References

External links 
 Airport record for Cutlass Bay Airport at Landings.com

Airports in the Bahamas
Cat Island, Bahamas